Vassberget is a mountain in Dovre Municipality in Innlandet county, Norway. The mountain is surrounded by several other notable mountains including Digerronden to the east; Veslesmeden, Storsmeden, and Trolltinden to the southeast; Sagtindan and Indre Bråkdalshøe to the south, Gråhøe to the west; and Stygghøin to the northeast.

See also
List of mountains of Norway

References

Dovre
Mountains of Innlandet